Lake Ontario Waterkeeper is a Toronto-based environmental justice advocacy group founded in 2001, with Lake Ontario, the Great Lakes Basin, and allied waterways at heart. It is a licensed member of the New York-based Waterkeeper Alliance, and a registered Canadian charity. It is led by President Mark Mattson, an environmental lawyer, and Vice President Krystyn Tully.

Actions and initiatives
In Summer of 2001 LOW triggered a $250 Million Federal Government remediation plan at Port Granby near Port Hope, Ontario. The dump, was established by Eldorado Mining and Refining Limited (and now managed by Cameco Corp.). In 2005 LOW campaigned the City of Kingston, Ontario to disclose timely data about repeated sewage discharges into Lake Ontario. In 2006 LOW produced "Heart of A Lake" concert tour to several cities in Ontario, Canada blending activism with art. Starting in 2006 LOW started a campaign opposing the burning of tires by Lafarge operations in Bath, Ontario. In 2007 LOW compelled the City of Toronto to disclose specific reasons why beaches are closed, and used the legal system to force the City to take responsibility. Citing a "little-known provincial environmental guideline called F-5 that says municipalities must ensure that beaches are clean enough for swimming 95 per cent of the time." This builds on a 2006 LOW report "Investigating Municipal Beaches: Lessons from Bluffer's Park" which cited some beaches were closed to swimming 42 per cent of the time.

In 2009, the organization launched Swim Drink Fish Music, an online music club which features rare and exclusive tracks by Canadian musicians.

Notable supporters
The Tragically Hip and particularly their frontman Gord Downie
Edward Burtynsky, photographer 
Sarah Harmer, folk musician
David Suzuki, Canadian environmentalist and broadcaster.
Bruce Cockburn, musician
Chris Brown, musician
Law Foundation of Ontario

See also

Great Lakes Areas of Concern

References

External links
 Lake Ontario Waterkeeper website
 List of all local Canadian Waterkeeper organizations

2001 establishments in Ontario
Environmental organizations based in Ontario
Charities based in Canada
Organizations based in Toronto
Organizations established in 2001